Business Center is business network CNBC's flagship primetime show that aired in 5 to 7 pm ET timeslot, hosted by Ron Insana and Sue Herera, and it was replaced by Bullseye on December 5, 2003.

History
Business Center was only a half-hour program to replace The Money Club, aired from 7 to 7:30 pm ET in 1997.
In c. 2000, it was expanded to 60 minutes, aired from 6:30 to 7:30.  It also started airing from the New York Stock Exchange.
In c. 2001, it was expanded to 90 minutes, aired from 6 to 7:30.
In 2002, it was expanded again to 120 minutes, aired from 5 to 7 pm.
In late 2002, 6:30 to 7 pm timeslot was once replaced by Checkpoint CNBC with Martha MacCallum (and later replaced by Tom Costello), and Business Center was restored to 90 minutes.
Ultimately, both Checkpoint CNBC and Business Center were cancelled on December 5, 2003 as they were replaced by Kudlow & Cramer and Bullseye, respectively.

Business Center anchors
Ron Insana and Sue Herera (1999–2003)
Maria Bartiromo and Tyler Mathisen (1997–1999)

Business Center Reporters
 Renay San Miguel
 Garrett Glaser
 Jim Paymar

Worldwide Business Center
Around CNBC's global branches, there are many counterparts of Business Center in the world:

1997 American television series debuts
2003 American television series endings
1990s American television talk shows
2000s American television talk shows
CNBC original programming
1990s American television news shows
2000s American television news shows
Business-related television series